The Colman House is a historic house in Diller, Nebraska. It was built in 1908-1909 for Andrew Colman and his wife, Lillie Osborne. It was designed by architect William F. Gernandt as a rectangular house with Queen Anne features. Colman was a landowner, and the president of the Citizens State Bank in Diller. He hired Charles Hansen and James Willer of Hansen & Willer to paint the walls and ceilings in 1912. The house has been listed on the National Register of Historic Places since June 25, 1982.

References

National Register of Historic Places in Jefferson County, Nebraska
Houses completed in 1908
Queen Anne architecture in Nebraska